The 4th Infantry Division, designated 4.Infanterie-Division in German was one of the first divisions raised and served during part of World War II. In 1940 it was reorganized as 14th Panzer Division.

History 

The 4th Infantry Division was raised in October 1934 in Dresden. It took part in the Invasion of Poland in 1939 and later the Battle of France in 1940. Later that year it was converted into the 14th Panzer Division.

Organization 

In 1937, the division's units were:
 Infantry Regiment 10
 Infantry Regiment 52
 Infantry Regiment 103
 Artillery Regiment 4
 I./Artillerie-Regiment 40
 Anti-tank (Panzer-Abwehr) Detachment 4
 Pioneer Battalion 4
 Signals (Nachricten) Detachment 4
 Machine gun Battalion 7

By 1939, the division's units were:
 Infanterie-Regiment 10
 Infanterie-Regiment 52
 Infanterie-Regiment 103
 Artillerie-Regiment 4
 I./Artillerie-Regiment 40
 Aufklärungs-Abteilung 4 (reconnaissance battalion)
 Panzerjäger-Abteilung 4 (anti-tank battalion)
 Pionier-Battalion 13 (engineer battalion)
 Nachrichten-Abteilung 4 (signals battalion)

Commanders 

The following officers commanded 4th Infantry Division:
 April 1, 1934, to November 10, 1938, Oberst (colonel) Erich Raschick
 November 10, 1938, to August 15, 1940, Gen. Lt.  Erick-Oskar Hansen

Knight's Cross 

No members of 4th Infantry Division were awarded  the Knight's Cross of the Iron Cross.

War service 

Polish Campaign:
September 1939: part of IV Corps, 10.Armee, German Army Group South
Low Countries and France:
May 1940: reserve division of German Army Group A
June 1940: part of IV Corps of 6.Armee of German Army Group B

See also

List of German divisions in World War II

References

 Burkhard Müller-Hillebrand: Das Heer 1933–1945. Entwicklung des organisatorischen Aufbaues.  Vol.III: Der Zweifrontenkrieg. Das Heer vom Beginn des Feldzuges gegen die Sowjetunion bis zum Kriegsende. Mittler: Frankfurt am Main 1969, p. 285.
 Georg Tessin: Verbände und Truppen der  deutschen Wehrmacht und Waffen-SS im Zweiten Weltkrieg, 1939 – 1945. Vol. II: Die Landstreitkräfte 1 -5.  Mittler: Frankfurt am Main 1966.

0*004
Military units and formations established in 1934
1934 establishments in Germany
Military units and formations disestablished in 1940